Chaudhary Muhammad Khalid was a politician who served as a Member of the Provincial Assembly of the Punjab thrice between 1985 and 1996. Affiliated to the Pakistan Peoples Party, he was elected as a representative from the PP-7 (Rawalpindi-II) constituency to serve the Kallar Syedan and Kahuta tehsils.

References

External links
یونین کونسل سموٹ کی سیاسی صورتحال
شہید راجہ محمد ریاست
Detailed Results of the Elections to the Provincial Assembly of the Punjab
Kallar Syedan neglected for development since the death of MPA Late Ch Khalid

Pakistan People's Party politicians
People from Kallar Syedan Tehsil
Punjab MPAs 1985–1988
Punjab MPAs 1988–1990
Punjab MPAs 1993–1996